The Hong Kong Film Award for Best Art Direction is an award presented annually at the Hong Kong Film Awards for the best art direction in a Hong Kong film. As of 2016, the current winners are William Chang and Alfred Yau for Office.

Winners and nominees

References

External links
 Hong Kong Film Awards Official Site

Hong Kong Film Awards